Howard Van Nostrand Valentine (December 14, 1881 – June 25, 1932) was an American track and field athlete who competed in the 1904 Summer Olympics and in the 1906 Summer Olympics.

He competed for the United States in the 1904 Summer Olympics held in St Louis, United States in the 800 metres where he won the silver medal and in the 1500 metres event where he finished seventh. He also competed for the New York Athletic Club team in the 4 mile team race against Chicago AA with teammates Arthur Newton, George Underwood, Paul Pilgrim and David Munson. They won the race and the gold medal.

Two years later at the Intercalated Games he was eliminated in the first round of the 400 metres and 800 metres events.

In 1911 his house was broken into and around 270 of his athletics cups and medals were stolen.

In 1932, upon suffering a heart attack, Valentine was admitted to the Broad Street Hospital in New York City where he later died. At the time of his death he was an office manager with the brokerage firm of E.C. Benedict & Co.

References

External links
 profile

1881 births
1932 deaths
American male middle-distance runners
American male long-distance runners
Athletes (track and field) at the 1904 Summer Olympics
Athletes (track and field) at the 1906 Intercalated Games
Olympic gold medalists for the United States in track and field
Olympic silver medalists for the United States in track and field
Medalists at the 1904 Summer Olympics